is a railway station on the Meitetsu Nagoya Main Line located in Minami-ku, Nagoya, Japan.

History
Yobitsugi Station was opened on 19 March 1917 as a station on the Aichi Electric Railway. On 1 April 1935, the Aichi Electric Railway merged with the Nagoya Railroad (the forerunner of present-day Meitetsu). The station has been unattended since September 2004.

Lines
Meitetsu
Meitetsu Nagoya Main Line

Layout
Yobitsugi Station has two elevated opposed side platforms.

Platforms

Adjacent stations

References

External links
 
 Official web page 

Railway stations in Japan opened in 1917
Stations of Nagoya Railroad
Railway stations in Aichi Prefecture